Zübeyde Kaya (born July 5, 1991) is a Turkish women's football defender, who most recently played in the Turkish Women's First League for Kdz. Ereğlispor. She was part of the Turkey girls' national U-17, Turkey women's U-19 and Turkey women's national teams.

Playing career

Club
Zübeyde Kaya obtained her license for Gazi Üniversitesispor in Ankara on May 31, 2004. She played until the end of the 2011–12 season capping 59 times and scoring four goals. In the 2009–10 season, she enjoyed her club's championship title in the Women's First League. She took part at three matches of the 2010–11 UEFA Champions League – Group 1 matches for Gazi Üniversitesispor.

In October 2012, Kaya was transferred by Kdz. Ereğlispor, where she played two seasons appearing in 33 matches.

International
She was admitted to the Turkey girls' national U-17 team and debuted in the friendly match against Azerbaijan on May 27, 2007. She played in seven matches and scored one goal for the national U-17 team.

Her first appearance in the Turkey women's U-19 team was in the friendly game against Bılgaria on May 5, 2007. She played in total 34 matches until 2010.

Kaya was called up to the national team, and played in the 2011 FIFA Women's World Cup qualification – UEFA Group 5 matches debuting in the game against England on July 29, 2010. She later participated at the UEFA Women's Euro 2013 qualifying – Group 2 matches, and also at a 2015 FIFA Women's World Cup qualification – UEFA Group 6 match. Zübeyde Kaya capped in seven matches for the Turkey women's national team.

During the UEFA Women's Euro 2013 qualifying home match against Germany on February 15, 2012, she broke her collar bone.

Career statistics

Honors
 Turkish Women's First League
 Gazi Üniversitesispor
 Winners (1): 2009–10
 Third places (1): 2008–09

 Kdz. Ereğlispor
 Third places (1): 2012–13

References

External links

Living people
1991 births
People from Sungurlu
Turkish women's footballers
Women's association football defenders
Turkey women's international footballers
Gazi Üniversitesispor players
Karadeniz Ereğlispor players